Askia Ishaq II was ruler of the Songhai Empire from 1588 to 1591.

Ishaq came to power in a long dynastic struggle following the death of the long-ruling Askia Daoud.  Sensing the Empire's weakness, Moroccan Sultan Ahmad I al-Mansur Saadi dispatched a 4,000-man force under the Islamicized Spaniard Judar Pasha across the Sahara desert in October 1590.  Though Ishaq assembled more than 40,000 soldiers to meet the Moroccans, his army fled the enemy's gunpowder weapons at the decisive Battle of Tondibi in March 1591; Judar soon seized and looted the Songhai capital of Gao as well as the trading centers of Timbuktu and Djenné, ensuring the Empire's destruction.

See also 

 Saadian invasion of the Songhai Empire

References
Davidson, Basil. Africa in History. New York: Simon & Schuster, 1995.
Velton, Ross. Mali: The Bradt Travel Guide. Guilford, Connecticut: Globe Pequot Press, 2000.

People of the Songhai Empire
16th-century monarchs in Africa